William John Ashley (14 May 1890 – 3 December 1968) was an Australian rules footballer who played with Port Adelaide in the SAFL from 1912 to 1915 and 1919.

Early life 
He was born in South Australia in 1890 but moved to Sydney with his family early the next decade.

Sydney football 
Ashley was a star footballer in the local Sydney Australian rules football league.

1911 Interstate carnival 
He represented New South Wales at the inaugural state carnival.

Port Adelaide 
A follower, Ashley would later become a regular for South Australia at interstate level. He was a best and fairest winner at Port Adelaide in 1914 and also won that year's Magarey Medal. The war interrupted the SAFL but when it returned in 1919 so did Ashley and he won another best and fairest award before retiring at the end of the season.

See also
 1911 Adelaide Carnival

Footnotes

References
 William John Ashley, at New South Wales Australian Football History Society.

External links

1890 births
1968 deaths
Australian rules footballers from New South Wales
Australian Rules footballers: place kick exponents
Port Adelaide Football Club (SANFL) players
Port Adelaide Football Club players (all competitions)
Balmain Australian Football Club players
East Sydney Australian Football Club players
Magarey Medal winners